Vladimir Jarmolenko (born 15 May 1948) is a Lithuanian politician, born in Astrakhan, Russian SFSR. In 1990 he was among those who signed the Act of the Re-Establishment of the State of Lithuania.

References
 Biography

1948 births
Living people
People from Astrakhan
Members of the Seimas
Homeland Union politicians
Signatories of the Act of the Re-Establishment of the State of Lithuania